Mohammad Ghazanfar (born 28 December 1994) is a Hong Kong cricketer. In April 2019, he was named in Hong Kong's squad for the 2019 ICC World Cricket League Division Two tournament in Namibia. He made his List A debut for Hong Kong against the United States in the 2019 ICC World Cricket League Division Two tournament on 24 April 2019.

Prior to his List A debut, he was selected for the Hong Kong Under-19 team in 2011, and in May 2013, he took eight wickets for fourteen runs in an ACC Under-19 Cup match against Thailand.

In September 2019, he was named in Hong Kong's Twenty20 International (T20I) squad for the 2019–20 Oman Pentangular Series, and the 2019 ICC T20 World Cup Qualifier tournament in the United Arab Emirates. He made his T20I debut for Hong Kong, against Nepal, on 6 October 2019.

In May 2022, he was named in Hong Kong's side for the 2022 Uganda Cricket World Cup Challenge League B tournament.

References

External links
 

1994 births
Living people
Hong Kong cricketers
Hong Kong Twenty20 International cricketers
Place of birth missing (living people)